Le chemin des écoliers is a 1959 French film starring Alain Delon. It is based on the novel The Transient Hour by Marcel Aymé.

Plot

Cast

 Alain Delon : Antoine Michaud
 Bourvil : Charles Michaud, Antoine's father
 Paulette Dubost : Hélène Michaud, Antoine's mother
 Martine Havet : Pierrette Michaud, Antoine's sister
 Françoise Arnoul : Yvette 
 Christian Lude : M. Olivier 
 Micheline Luccioni : Solange 
 Jean-Claude Brialy : Paul Tiercelin 
 Lino Ventura : M. Tiercelin 
 Pierre Mondy : Lulu 
 Madeleine Lebeau : Flora 
 Sandra Milo : Olga 
 Gaby Basset : Lucette 
 Claude Castaing : Dominique 
 Jean Brochard : M. Coutelier
 Hans Verner : un officier allemand
 Charles Bouillaud : le client enrhumé 
 Pierre Collet : un gendarme

References

External links

French drama films
1959 films
Films based on French novels
Films based on works by Marcel Aymé
Films directed by Michel Boisrond
Films with screenplays by Jean Aurenche
Films with screenplays by Pierre Bost
1950s French-language films
1950s French films